The Moore 30 is an American sailboat, that was designed by Gary Mull as a racer and first built in 1985.

Production
The boat was built by Moore Sailboats in Watsonville, California, United States, starting in 1985. Only five were built and it is now out of production.

Design
The Moore 30 is a small recreational keelboat, built predominantly of fiberglass. It has a fractional sloop rig and a fixed fin keel. It displaces  and carries  of ballast.

See also
List of sailing boat types

References

Keelboats
1980s sailboat type designs
Sailing yachts
Sailboat type designs by Gary Mull
Sailboat types built by Moore Sailboats